Zareh is an Armenian masculine given name, derived from a legendary king mentioned in chapter 1.31 of Movses Khorenatsi's History of Armenia. The name is of Iranian origin. It was in use among Armenians from the second century BCE to the fourth century CE, after which it fell out of use. It was revived in the nineteenth century and is now a common male name.

References 

Armenian given names
Armenian masculine given names